The Cours Florent is a private French drama school in Paris established in 1967 by François Florent.

The school is located on three nearby sites in the 19th arrondissement of Paris, France: rue Archereau, rue Mathis, and Avenue Jean-Jaurès; further along is the Conservatoire national supérieur de musique et de danse de Paris. The Cours Florent also has locations in Brussels, Belgium, Montpellier, France, and Bordeaux, France.

Programs
The Cours Florent is known as one of France's most prestigious drama schools, offering a three-year program to learn acting and theatre classes for children, teenagers, and adults.

Since 2011, the school also offers a three-year program in English called "Acting in English" for English-speaking students and foreigners. Students can apply to this program during the school year. Auditions are organized in May and September, and 2 intensive summer programs are available in July and August.

Cours Florent International courses offer students not only the chance to refine their dramatic acting skills but also to experience full immersion in the cultural and artistic life of France.

The school has a specialized class to prepare students for the competitive examination of the prestigious Conservatoire national supérieur d'Art dramatique de Paris (CNSAD), as well as the École nationale supérieure des arts et techniques du théâtre (ENSATT) in Lyon and the École supérieure d'art dramatique of the Strasbourg National Theater. But the Cours Florent is above all famous for its Classe libre (Free class) where many French actors and actresses have studied, with teachers like Francis Huster, Jean-Pierre Garnier, Hervé Falloux and Antonia Malinova.

Cours Florent also has a series of Master Classes with major international teachers, like Mark Bell, and actors such as Olivier Marchal, Gilles Lellouche and alumni Diane Kruger, Gad Elmaleh, Guillaume Canet and Jacques Weber among others.

Notable alumni 
Over its history, many notable people have graduated from the Cours Florent, including:

Isabelle Adjani
Noémie Merlant
Morjana Alaoui
Yvan Attal
Mylène Farmer
Daniel Auteuil
Elia, Crown Princess of Albania
Édouard Baer
Jeanne Balibar
Malik Bentalha
Dominique Blanc
Guillaume Canet
Jil Caplan
Isabelle Carré
Cecil Castellucci
Nicolas Cazalé
Anne Consigny
Clotilde Courau
Jean-Pierre Darroussin
Alain Defossé
Emmanuelle Devos
Guillaume De Tonquédec
Marie de Villepin
Vincent Elbaz
Gad Elmaleh
Stéphane Freiss
Thierry Frémont
José Garcia
Olivier Gourmet
Eva Green
Agnès Jaoui
Marina Hands
Francis Huster
Pom Klementieff
Diane Kruger
Samuel Le Bihan
Vincent Lindon
Luce
Sophie Marceau
Pierre Niney
Sarah Perles
Jérôme Pradon
Cristiana Reali
Muriel Robin
Sebastian Roché
Jean-Paul Rouve
Mathilde Seigner
Audrey Tautou
Gaspard Ulliel
Arnaud Valois
Tasha de Vasconcelos
Jacques Weber
Océane Zhu
Elsa Zylberstein

References

External links
  Official English website

Education in Paris
Drama schools in France
Film schools in France
Educational institutions established in 1967
1967 establishments in France